A statue of Andrew Jackson is installed in Jackson, Mississippi, United States. The memorial is slated for removal, as of July 2020.

See also
 List of monuments and memorials removed during the George Floyd protests

References

Buildings and structures in Jackson, Mississippi
Outdoor sculptures in Mississippi
Sculptures of men in Mississippi
Statues in Mississippi
Jackson, Mississippi